In the Book of Mormon, Zenock is a nonbiblical prophet whose described life predates the events of the book's main plot and whose prophecies and statements are recorded upon the brass plates possessed by the Nephites. In the narrative, Zenock is a descendant of the biblical Joseph, and he is also an ancestor of the Nephites. Narrators of the Book of Mormon and Nephite prophets quote or paraphrase Zenock several times in the course of the text, including Nephi, Alma, son of Alma, Amulek, Nephi, son of Helaman, and Mormon. Zenock's teachings as referenced in the Book of Mormon include prophesying about the Messiah, describing the death of Jesus as part of the Christian atonement, and rebuking people who reject that message. In the Book of Alma, Alma reports that Zenock was stoned to death for preaching that the Messiah would be the "Son of God."

In the earliest manuscripts of the Book of Mormon, the intended spelling of Zenock was Zenoch, resembling the biblical Enoch. Oliver Cowdery, who transcribed part of the Book of Mormon, misspelled the name when he copied the text to a printer's manuscript, and that spelling has carried over to almost all published editions of the Book of Mormon.

Background 
According to Joseph Smith, he translated an ancient record on gold plates, doing so by miraculous power given by God and dictating it to scribes who wrote it down in an intermittent process Smith performed from 1829 to 1830. The resulting text was published in 1830 as the Book of Mormon, and it is the primary religious text of the Latter Day Saint movement.

In the book's narrative, God prophetically guides a man named Lehi, along with his family, to leave Jerusalem in approximately 600 BCE in order to avoid the Babylonian captivity. God guides this family to the Americas where they establish a society and live as what Terryl Givens calls "pre-Christian Christians" which eventually splits into two peoples, Nephites and Lamanites. The majority of the book is framed as the retrospective work of its narrators, including Nephi and Mormon, who self-reflexively describe their own creation of the text as a record scribed onto metal plates preserved by their peoples. Within the book's narrative, these plates are modeled on the brass plates, a metallic set of records written in Egyptian which Lehi's family bring with them from Jerusalem to the Americas. The Book of Mormon describes the brass plates as containing "a record of the Jews", "the law", and scriptures.

Narrative 

Within the Book of Mormon's overall narrative and sometime prior to the chronological beginning of its main plot, Zenock was an extrabiblical prophet who lived in the Old World at some unidentified time after the "days of Abraham". In the Book of Mormon narrative Nephi quotes Zenock, along with another extrabiblical prophet Zenos, while transcribing prophetic writings onto the small plates of Nephi. It is implied that the brass plates are the source for material which the Book of Mormon attributes to named extrabiblical prophets, including Zenock. While narrating, Mormon calls the Nephites and Lamanites a "remnant of their seed", their being Zenock and Zenos, implying that Zenock is an ancestor of the Nephites and shares their described descent from the biblical Joseph.

Zenock taught about Jesus being the son of God who would "be lifted up" and die as part of performing the Christian atonement. He also taught that God was merciful to people because of Jesus. According to John L. Clark, Zenock's prophecies about the Messiah are "clear" but "much less specific" than Christological prophecies set during the Book of Mormon's main plot, such as from Lehi and Nephi. Because of Zenock's teachings, the people he taught persecuted him, banished him, and stoned him to death.

Textual history 
In almost all published editions of the Book of Mormon, the name of this figure is spelled Zenock. However, the earliest spelling of Zenock's name in Book of Mormon manuscripts was Zenoch rather than Zenock. However, he immediately crossed out Zenock and replaced it with Zenoch, likely prompted by Smith. Spelled Zenoch, the name resembles the biblical name Enoch. However, when Cowdery copied the text into the printer's manuscript, he replaced Zenoch with Zenock. The name was spelled Zenock in the 1830 first edition of the Book of Mormon, and the misspelling persisted across subsequent editions, including the current edition published by the Church of Jesus Christ of Latter-day Saints (LDS Church).

Grant Hardy speculates that additional content about Zenock could have existed in "the lost 116 pages", a portion of the original manuscript of the Book of Mormon which Smith and his cohorts lost and never reproduced.

Interpretation 
The Book of Mormon narrator Nephi quotes Zenock along with other nonbiblical and biblical prophets as part of a transition of topic and tone in the record he describes himself keeping. The first portion of Nephi's narration pertains to the history and experiences of his family (1 Nephi 1–18). Nephi introduces Zenock and others in 1 Nephi 19–2 Nephi 5 while also writing more about spiritual topics. These citations produce what Frederick W. Axelgard calls an "intense prophetic aspect" of the writing, and after citing Zenock and others, Nephi narrates having a spiritual experience. Nephi citing biblical and nonbiblical prophets provides a bridge between the event- and narrative- focused beginning of his record and the more spiritual and prophetic latter part.

A Book of Mormon prophet named Alma cites Zenock during his ministry in the city of Zoram. While teaching a group of economically poor Zoramites, Alma brings up Zenock and how he was misunderstood and made an outcast. The account of Zenock being an oppressed prophet suggests sympathy with the poor Zoramites amid the injustices they face. By quoting Zenock, Alma sets up his companion Amulek's central message calling for the Zoramites to maintain faith in Christ despite their limited circumstances.

Citing Zenock also serves a rhetorical purpose against the wealthy Zoramites opposed to Alma. Alma quotes Zenock saying, "Thou art angry, O Lord, with this people, because they will not understand thy mercies which thou hast bestowed upon them because of thy Son". Zenock's reference to people who refused to understand his own messianic prophecies serves as Alma's indirect reference to his audience's rejection of Jesus as described in Alma's message.

Alma's reference to Zenock while preaching to the economically poor group of Zoramites suggests that within the setting of the book's narrative, familiarity with recorded scriptures is high among Nephites, such that even the socioeconomically disadvantaged are conversant with the contents of the brass plates which contain Zenock's teachings.

While narrating a divine cataclysm that affects the Nephites, Mormon refers to Zenock and affirms that the events confirmed Zenock's prophecies. As narrator, Mormon presents Zenock's prophecy and its fulfilment within the narrative as proof that religious faith is reasonable.

Reception

Early Mormonism 
Orson Pratt, an apostle in the early Latter Day Saint movement and in the LDS Church, expressed his belief that additional prophecies from Zenock were contained in additional ancient plates hidden in the hill Cumorah to someday be recovered and revealed by the will of God.

Modern Latter Day Saints 
In a study of Mormon naming practices, published in 2012, folklorist Jennifer R. Mansfield reports meeting one Latter-day Saint whose parents named him Zenock. She hypothesizes that although other Book of Mormon names (such as Alma, Ammon, Moroni, and Nephi) are popular among Mormons, Zenock is not as popular because of general unfamiliarity with him and his name, possibly because there is only one Zenock in the Book of Mormon and because LDS Church material mentions the figure infrequently.

The name Zenock does not appear in the Bible. Outside of the Book of Mormon, there is no evidence of the existence of Zenock. Some Latter-day Saints apologists, such as Hugh Nibley, attempt to prove or prove plausible an ancient setting for the Book of Mormon, including by speculating Hebrew or Egyptian etymologies of names and identities of figures described in the Book of Mormon, such as Zenock.

Hugh Nibley 
Hugh Nibley, a Latter-day Saint apologist, related Zenock to a reference in the Dead Sea Scrolls to an ancient prophet known as the Teacher of Righteousness who was driven out of Jewish society because he preached of the coming of a Messiah. This Teacher of Righteousness was part of a priestly lineage descended from someone named Zadok. The Teacher of Righteousness' own name may have also been Zadok. According to Nibley, the "type of prophet" Zenock is—one cast out for preaching about the Messiah—resembles Zadok's story in the Dead Sea Scrolls. Nibley claimed that Zenock in the Book of Mormon could be an altered version of the Dead Sea Scrolls name Zadok, possibly a result of erroneous corruption during transcription.

A roundtable discussion about the Dead Sea Scrolls, held by BYU professors, characterized as a "false rumor" the notion some Latter-day Saints held that Zenock was in the scrolls; Donald Parry stated that "Zenock [is] not mentioned" in them.

Christopher Marc Nemelka 
Zenock appears in a publication called the Book of Lehi, produced and published by Christopher Marc Nemelka. Nemelka claimed that in sometime in the late-1980s and early-to-mid-1990s, the deceased Joseph Smith appeared to him and gave him the gold plates of the Book of Mormon. Nemelka said that he translated from the plates to produce the Book of Lehi. In Nemelka's Book of Lehi, Lehi and Zenock are contemporaries. In the course of the text, Zenock confronts the religious establishment with an accusation of corruption, and Lehi believes Zenock's message. After Zenock's life is temporarily imperiled, Lehi rescues him, and then Lehi becomes a target of the Book of Mormon figure Laban.

Embaye Melekin 
Embaye Melekin, an Eritrean baptized into the LDS Church in 2006, considers Zenock evidence that the Book of Mormon was anciently set not in the Americas but in the Horn of Africa. In Eritrea, which is in the Horn of Africa, it is common to preface names with a z, and according to Melekin, Zenock is therefore the name Enoch prefaced with a z. By interpreting Zenock (and the similar Zenos) in this manner, Melekin resolves for himself the presence of nonbiblical names in the Book of Mormon, something researcher Steven L. Shields calls a "Book of Mormon anomaly that critics point out".

See also

Neum (Book of Mormon)
Sons of Zadok

References

Citations

Works cited

Further reading

External links 

 Zenock in the Latter-day Saint Guide to the Scriptures

Book of Mormon prophets
Deaths by stoning